Down on the Farm was a British television series which aired in 1939 on the BBC. The series featured A. G. Street, and was about work on the farm. The series aired monthly, and likely ended due to the suspension of the BBC television service on 1 September 1939.

None of the episodes still exist, as they aired live, and methods used to record live television were not developed until late 1947, and were used very rarely by the BBC until around 1953–1955.

References

External links
Down on the Farm on IMDb

1930s British television series
1939 British television series debuts
1939 British television series endings
Lost BBC episodes
BBC Television shows
Black-and-white British television shows
British live television series